Flavobacterium aquaticum  is a Gram-negative bacterium from the genus of Flavobacterium which has been isolated from water from a rice field from Jamdih in India.

References

External links
Type strain of Flavobacterium aquaticum at BacDive -  the Bacterial Diversity Metadatabase

 

aquaticum
Bacteria described in 2013